Crotonyl-CoA reductase (butyryl-CoA dehydrogenase, butyryl dehydrogenase, unsaturated acyl-CoA reductase, ethylene reductase, enoyl-coenzyme A reductase, unsaturated acyl coenzyme A reductase, butyryl coenzyme A dehydrogenase, short-chain acyl CoA dehydrogenase, short-chain acyl-coenzyme A dehydrogenase, 3-hydroxyacyl CoA reductase, butanoyl-CoA:(acceptor) 2,3-oxidoreductase, CCR) is an enzyme with systematic name butanoyl-CoA:NADP+ 2,3-oxidoreductase. This enzyme catalyses the following chemical reaction

 butanoyl-CoA + NADP+  (E)-but-2-enoyl-CoA + NADPH + H+

This enzyme catalyses the reaction in the reverse direction.

References

External links 
 

EC 1.3.1